Sapphire is the twelfth album by Teena Marie, released on May 9, 2006 on the Cash Money label. It includes guest contributions from Smokey Robinson, George Duke, Gerald Albright, rapper Kurupt, and Marie's daughter, Alia Rose.

The album's lead single "Ooh Wee" featuring rapper Kurupt peaked at #32 on the US Hot R&B Singles chart. The track "You Blow Me Away" pays tribute to Rick James, while "Resilient (Sapphire)" remembers the victims and survivors of Hurricane Katrina.

Sapphire peaked at #3 on the US R&B Albums chart and #24 on the Billboard 200.

Track listing

Charts

Weekly charts

Year-end charts

References

Teena Marie albums
Cash Money Records albums
2006 albums
Hip hop albums by American artists